The Northwest Washington Fair is the only fair located in Whatcom County. Since 1909 it is held every August in Lynden, Washington.

The fair brings more than 200,000 people to the area during fair week, Monday through Saturday. Monday is always a demolition derby with various performers the rest of the week at the fair's large grandstand. Brad Paisley has performed in years past along with Heart, Billy Currington, The Oak Ridge Boys, Terri Clark, Merle Haggard, Clay Walker, George Canyon, Ted Nugent, Journey, Collective Soul, Hunter Hayes and the Bill Gaither Vocal Band as well as many other performers. There is also a small stage featuring a variety of free entertainment, and a community stage featuring local performers.

The fair features a large display of FFA and 4-H animals as well as open class animal exhibits. Because of the agricultural heritage of Lynden, the animals are a highlight of the fair with a  barn showcasing swine, sheep, llamas and alpacas, beef cattle, and the award-winning Small Animal Experience. There is also a large dairy cattle barn, a light horse barn, pony barn, draft horse barn, poultry and rabbit barns, and dog and cat tent. The fair features horse shows daily in front of the grandstand. Many animal contests and shows are scheduled each day in the respective barns.

The fair also features a large carnival along with a smaller kids carnival. It has a large array of buildings and spaces for commercial vendors to set up their temporary shops. There are also departments in which to enter open class (non FFA or 4-H) homemade quilts, photographs, collections, canned goods, baked items, vegetables and flowers, and many other displays. The equine facility hosts a wide variety of events.

In August 2010 the fair celebrated its 100th anniversary. During the off season the fair rents its facilities for many different events as well as RV storage.

References

External links

 

Washington
Annual fairs
Lynden, Washington
Fairs in the United States
Tourist attractions in Whatcom County, Washington
Fairs in Washington (state)